Cactus Flat (also Cactus Flat Junction, Cactus Flats) is an unincorporated community in Jackson County, South Dakota, United States. The community is home to several nearby campgrounds and prairie dog towns which are marketed as tourist attractions.

Buildings 
The Ranch Store building was originally located in Kadoka, South Dakota, but was later moved to Cactus Flat.

See also 
Prairie Homestead

Notes

Unincorporated communities in Jackson County, South Dakota
Unincorporated communities in South Dakota